A sodium–sulfur battery is a type of molten-salt battery that uses liquid sodium and liquid sulfur electrodes. This type of battery has a similar energy density to lithium-ion batteries, and is fabricated from inexpensive and non-toxic materials. However, due to the high operating temperature required (usually between 300 and 350 °C), as well as the highly corrosive and reactive nature of sodium and sodium polysulfides, these batteries are primarily suited for stationary energy storage applications, rather than for use in vehicles. Despite their low cost, molten sodium-sulfur batteries suffer from safety and durability issues, such as a short cycle life of fewer than 1000 cycles on average. As a result, these batteries have not achieved significant commercial deployment.

Like many high-temperature batteries, sodium-sulfur cells become more economical with increasing size. This is because of the square-cube law: large cells have less relative heat loss, so maintaining their high operating temperatures is easier. Commercially available cells are typically large with high capacities (up to 500Ah). 

A similar type of battery called the ZEBRA battery, which uses a / cathode in place of sulfur, has had greater commercial interest in the past, but as of 2023 there are no commercial manufacturers of ZEBRA. Room-temperature sodium-sulfur are also known. They use neither liquid sodium nor liquid sulfur and operate on entirely different principles and face different challenges than the high-temperature molten Na-S batteries discussed here.

Construction 
Typical batteries have a solid electrolyte membrane between the anode and cathode, compared with liquid-metal batteries where the anode, the cathode and the membrane are liquids.

The cell is usually made in a cylindrical configuration. The entire cell is enclosed by a steel casing that is protected, usually by chromium and molybdenum, from corrosion on the inside. This outside container serves as the positive electrode, while the liquid sodium serves as the negative electrode. The container is sealed at the top with an airtight alumina lid. An essential part of the cell is the presence of a BASE (beta-alumina solid electrolyte) membrane, which selectively conducts Na+. In commercial applications the cells are arranged in blocks for better heat conservation and are encased in a vacuum-insulated box.

For operation, the entire battery must be heated to, or above, the melting point of sulphur at 119 C. Sodium has a lower melting point, around 98 C, so a battery that holds molten sulphur holds molten sodium by default. This presents a serious safety concern; sodium can be spontaneously inflammable in air, and sulphur is highly flammable. Several examples of the Ford Ecostar, equipped with such a battery, burst into flame during recharging, leading Ford to give up on the concept.

Operation 
During the discharge phase, molten elemental sodium at the core serves as the anode, meaning that the Na donates electrons to the external circuit.  The sodium is separated by a beta-alumina solid electrolyte (BASE) cylinder from the container of molten sulfur, which is fabricated from an inert metal serving as the cathode. The sulfur is absorbed in a carbon sponge.

BASE is a good conductor of sodium ions above 250 °C, but a poor conductor of electrons, and thus avoids self-discharge. Sodium metal does not fully wet the BASE below 400 °C due to a layer of oxide(s) separating them; this temperature can be lowered to 300 °C by coating the BASE with certain metals and/or by adding oxygen getters to the sodium, but even so wetting will fail below 200 °C. Before the cell can begin operation, it must be heated, which creates extra costs. To tackle this challenge, case studies to couple sodium-sulfur batteries to thermal solar energy systems. The heat energy collected from the sun would be used to pre-heat the cells and maintain the high temperatures for short periods between use. Once running, the heat produced by charging and discharging cycles is sufficient to maintain operating temperatures and usually no external source is required.

When sodium gives off an electron, the Na+ ion migrates to the sulfur container. The electron drives an electric current through the molten sodium to the contact, through the electrical load and back to the sulfur container. Here, another electron reacts with sulfur to form Sn2−, sodium polysulfide.  The discharge process can be represented as follows:

2 Na + 4 S → Na2S4  (Ecell ~ 2 V)

As the cell discharges, the sodium level drops. During the charging phase the reverse process takes place.

Safety
Pure sodium presents a hazard, because it spontaneously burns in contact with air and moisture, thus the system must be protected from water and oxidizing atmospheres.

2011 Tsukuba Plant fire incident
Early on the morning of September 21, 2011, a 2000 kilowatt NaS battery system manufactured by NGK,  owned by Tokyo Electric Power Company used for storing electricity and installed at the Tsukuba, Japan Mitsubishi Materials Corporation plant caught fire. Following the incident, NGK temporarily suspended production of NaS batteries.

Development

United States
Ford Motor Company pioneered the battery in the 1960s to power early-model electric cars.

, a lower temperature, solid electrode version was under development in Utah by Ceramatec. They use a NASICON membrane to allow operation at 90 °C with all components remaining solid.

In 2014 researchers identified a liquid sodium-caesium alloy that operates at 150 °C and produces 420 milliampere-hours per gram. The material fully coated ("wetted") the electrolyte. After 100 charge/discharge cycles, a test battery maintained about 97% of its initial storage capacity. The lower operating temperature allowed the use of a less-expensive polymer external casing instead of steel, offsetting some of the increased cost associated with using caesium.

Japan
The NaS battery was one of four battery types selected as candidates for intensive research by MITI as part of the "Moonlight Project" in 1980. This project sought to develop a durable utility power storage device meeting the criteria shown below in a 10-year project.
1,000 kW class
8 hour charge/8 hour discharge at rated load
Efficiency of 70% or better
Lifetime of 1,500 cycles or better
The other three were improved lead–acid, redox flow (vanadium type), and zinc-bromide batteries.

A consortium formed by TEPCO (Tokyo Electric Power Co.) and NGK (NGK Insulators Ltd.) declared their interest in researching the NaS battery in 1983, and became the primary drivers behind the development of this type ever since.  TEPCO chose the NaS battery because all its component elements (sodium, sulfur and ceramics) are abundant in Japan. The first large-scale field testing took place at TEPCO's Tsunashima substation between 1993 and 1996, using 3 x 2 MW, 6.6 kV battery banks. Based on the findings from this trial, improved battery modules were developed and were made commercially available in 2000. The commercial NaS battery bank offers:
Capacity : 25–250 kWh per bank
Efficiency of 87%
Lifetime of 2,500 cycles at 100% depth of discharge (DOD), or 4,500 cycles at 80% DOD

A demonstration project used NaS battery at Japan Wind Development Co.’s Miura Wind Park in Japan.

Japan Wind Development opened a 51 MW wind farm that incorporates a 34 MW sodium sulfur battery system at Futamata in Aomori Prefecture in May 2008.

As of 2007, 165 MW of capacity were installed in Japan. NGK announced in 2008 a plan to expand its NaS factory output from 90 MW a year to 150 MW a year.

In 2010 Xcel Energy announced that it would test a wind farm energy storage battery based on twenty 50 kW sodium–sulfur batteries. The 80 tonne, 2 semi-trailer sized battery is expected to have 7.2 MW·h of capacity at a charge and discharge rate of 1 MW. Since then, NGK announced several large scale deployments including a virtual plant distributed on 10 sites in UAE totaling 108 MW/648 MWh in 2019.

In March 2011, Sumitomo Electric Industries and Kyoto University announced that they had developed a low temperature molten sodium ion battery that can output power at under 100 °C. The batteries have double the energy density of Li-ion and considerably lower cost. Sumitomo Electric Industry CEO Masayoshi Matsumoto indicated that the company planned to begin production in 2015. Initial applications are envisaged to be buildings and buses.

Challenges 
Molten sodium beta-alumina batteries failed to meet the durability and safety expectations, that were the basis of several commercialization attempts in the 1980s . A characteristic lifetime of Na-S batteries was determined as 1,000-2,000 cycles in a Weibull distribution with k=0.5.
There are several degradation pathways:
 During charge, sodium metal dendrites tend to form (slowly after several cycles) and propagate (rather quickly once they nucleate) into the intergrain boundaries in the solid beta-alumina electrolyte, eventually leading to internal short-circuiting and immediate failure. In general, a significant threshold current density needs to be exceeded before such rapid Mode I fracture-degradation is initiated.

 Beta-alumina surface layer on the Na side turns grey after > 100 cycles. This is caused by a slower growth of micron-size sodium metal globules in the triple-junctions between the grains of the solid electrolyte. This process is possible, because the electronic conductivity of beta-alumina is small but not zero.  The formation of such sodium metal globules gradually increases the electronic conductivity of the electrolyte and causes electronic leakage and self-discharge;

 Darkening of the beta-alumina also occurs on the sulfur side upon passing electric current, albeit at a slower schedule that the darkening on the sodium side. It is believed to be due to the deposition of carbon, which is added to the bulk sulfur to provide electronic conductivity.

 Oxygen-depletion in the alumina near the sodium electrode has been suggested as a possible cause for the following crack formation.

 Disproportionation of sulfur into aluminum sulfate and sodium polysulfide has been suggested as a degradation pathway. This mechanism is not mentioned in later publications.

 Passing current (e.g. >1 A/cm2) through beta-alumina can cause temperature gradient (e.g. > 50 °C/ 2 mm) in the electrolyte, which in turn results in a thermal stress.

Applications

Grid and standalone systems

NaS batteries can be deployed to support the electric grid, or for stand-alone renewable power applications. Under some market conditions, NaS batteries provide value via energy arbitrage (charging battery when electricity is abundant/cheap, and discharging into the grid when electricity is more valuable) and voltage regulation. NaS batteries are a possible energy storage technology to support renewable energy generation, specifically wind farms and solar generation plants. In the case of a wind farm, the battery would store energy during times of high wind but low power demand. This stored energy could then be discharged from the batteries during peak load periods. In addition to this power shifting, sodium sulfur batteries could be used to assist in stabilizing the power output of the wind farm during wind fluctuations. These types of batteries present an option for energy storage in locations where other storage options are not feasible. For example, pumped-storage hydroelectricity facilities require significant space and water resources, while compressed air energy storage (CAES) requires some type of geologic feature such as a salt cave.

In 2016, the Mitsubishi Electric Corporation commissioned the world's largest sodium–sulfur battery in Fukuoka Prefecture, Japan. The facility offers energy storage to help manage energy levels during peak times with renewable energy sources.

Space 
Because of its high energy density, the NaS battery has been proposed for space applications. Sodium sulfur cells can be made space-qualified: in fact a test sodium sulfur cell flew on the Space Shuttle.  The NaS flight experiment demonstrated a battery with a specific energy of 150 W·h/kg (3 x nickel–hydrogen battery energy density), operating at 350 °C. It was launched on the STS-87 mission in November 1997, and demonstrated 10 days of experimental operation.

The Venus Landsailing Rover mission concept is also considering the use of this type of battery, as the rover and its payload are being designed to function for about 50 days on the hot surface of Venus without a cooling system.

Transport and heavy machinery
The first large-scale use of sodium–sulfur batteries was in the Ford "Ecostar" demonstration vehicle, an electric vehicle prototype in 1991.  The high operating temperature of sodium sulfur batteries presented difficulties for electric vehicle use, however. The  Ecostar never went into production.

Room Temperature Sodium-Sulfur Batteries

One of the main shortcomings of traditional sodium-sulfur batteries is that they require high temperatures to operate. This means that they must be preheated before use, and that they will consume some of their stored energy (up to 14%) to maintain this temperature when not in use. Aside from saving energy, room temperature operation mitigates safety issues such as explosions which can occur due to failure of the solid electrolyte during operation at high temperatures. Research and development of sodium-sulfur batteries that can operate at room temperature is ongoing. Despite the higher theoretical energy density of sodium-sulfur cells at room temperature compared to high temperature, operation at room temperature introduces challenges like:

 Poor conductivity of sulfur and sodium polysulfides
 Volume expansion of sulfur, which creates mechanical stresses within the battery
 Low reaction rates between the sodium and sulfur
 Formation of dendrites on the sodium anode which create short-circuits in the battery. This is contributed to by the shuttle effect which is explained below.
 Shorter cycle life which means that the cells must be replaced more often than their high-temperature counterparts.

The Shuttle Effect:

The shuttle effect in sodium-sulfur batteries leads to a loss of capacity, which can be defined as a reduction in the amount of energy that can be extracted from the battery. When the battery is being discharged, sodium ions react with sulfur (which is in the S8 form) at the cathode to form polysulfides in the following steps:

The problem occurs when the soluble polysulfide forms migrate to the anode, where they form the insoluble polysulfides. These insoluble polysulfides form as dendrites on the anode which can damage the battery and interferes with the movement of sodium ions into the electrolyte. Furthermore, the insoluble polysulfides at the anode cannot be converted back into sulfur when the battery is being recharged, which means that less sulfur is available for the battery to function (capacity loss). Research is being conducted into how the shuttle effect can be avoided.

See also
 List of battery types
Lithium–sulfur battery
Molten salt battery

References

External links

  Advanced Energy Storage for Renewable Energy Technologies
 

Rechargeable batteries
Metal-sulfur batteries
Energy storage